J. floribunda may refer to:

 Jacksonia floribunda, a leafless shrub
 Justicia floribunda, a plant native to Brazil